Max de Terra (born in Zurich, 6 October 1918 – died in Zurich, 29 December 1982) was a racing driver from Switzerland. He participated in two Formula One World Championship Grands Prix, debuting on 18 May 1952. He scored no championship points.

He was a member of the Ecurie Espadon.

Complete Formula One World Championship results
(key)

References 

1918 births
1982 deaths
Swiss racing drivers
Swiss Formula One drivers
Écurie Espadon Formula One drivers
Sportspeople from Zürich